Long May You Run is a studio album credited to the Stills–Young Band, a collaboration between Stephen Stills and Neil Young, released in 1976 on Reprise Records. It peaked at #26 on the Billboard 200 and was certified gold in the United States by the RIAA. The album is the sole studio release by Stills and Young as a duo.

Background
Following the Crosby, Stills, Nash & Young stadium tour of 1974, an attempt by the quartet to finalize a new album ended amidst acrimony without result. David Crosby and Graham Nash resumed their partnership, while Stills and Young continued their independent careers. Songs from the aborted CSNY album appeared on various albums by group members, and Stills covered two Young songs on his contemporary studio albums: "New Mama" on Stills and "The Loner" on Illegal Stills.

In early 1976, Stills and Young reached a rapprochement, and began to work on a joint album project from a desire by both to pick up where they left off with their Buffalo Springfield-era guitar explorations, a decade after the inception of the band. Crosby and Nash signed on as well, and briefly Long May You Run looked to be the awaited CSNY reunion album. However, on a deadline Nash and Crosby left Miami to finish the sessions for what would become their 1976 album Whistling Down the Wire, and Young and Stills reacted by removing the duo's vocals and other contributions from the master tapes. Crosby and Nash vowed never to work with either again, although less than a year later they would regroup with Stills for the album CSN.

The Stills-Young Band, comprising Stills' then-current touring band behind the pair, began a tour in 1976 prior to the album's release. The tour commenced in Clarkston, Michigan on June 23, but after nineteen dates Young dropped out after July 20 via a telegram to Stills, forcing Stills to complete the concert tour solo through October. The telegram read: "Dear Stephen, funny how some things that start spontaneously end that way. Eat a peach. Neil." Young would later cite cryptic personal reasons for his departure, namely that he had "voice issues" but he has since stated the tour "wasn't working" and that the "balance was off in some way" as it progressed. During the tour, critics were writing harsh reviews of Stills while praising Young, titled "Young Hot, Stills Not". Stills began drinking heavily and started to take out his frustrations on tour personnel thinking they were purposefully making him look bad. However, even after Young told Stills not to read the reviews, he would not accept the advice, so Young left.
 
The album's advance single, "Long May You Run", peaked at #71 on the UK singles chart. The song was an elegy for Neil Young's first car (which he nicknamed "Mort"), a 1948 Buick Roadmaster hearse that died in 1962 when its transmission blew in Blind River, Ontario. Mort was a different vehicle from the 1953 Pontiac hearse, nicknamed Mort 2, that Richie Furay, traveling with Stills, saw Young driving in a Hollywood traffic jam in 1966 that led to the formation of Buffalo Springfield. On January 22, 2010, Young performed "Long May You Run" on the final episode of The Tonight Show with Conan O'Brien. A few weeks later, Young performed the song during the closing ceremony of the 2010 Winter Olympics in Vancouver, accompanying the extinguishment of the Olympic cauldron.

Track listing
Side oneSide two

Personnel 
 Stephen Stills – vocals, acoustic piano,  guitars
 Neil Young – vocals, acoustic piano, string synthesizer, guitars, harmonica

Additional musicians
 Jerry Aiello – organ, acoustic piano
 George "Chocolate" Perry – bass, backing vocals
 Joe Vitale – drums, flute, backing vocals
 Joe Lala – percussion, backing vocals

Production 
 Stephen Stills – producer, mixing 
 Neil Young – producer, mixing 
 Don Gehman – producer, recording, mixing
 Tom Dowd – associate producer
 Steve Hart – recording assistant
 Michael Lasko – recording assistant
 Alex Sadkin – mixing
 Tom Wilkes – album design

Charts

Certifications

Tour 

Personnel

 Jerry Aiello – organ
 Chris Hillman – guitar, vocals (for two dates after Young departed)
 Joe Lala – percussion
 George "Chocolate" Perry – bass guitar
 Stephen Stills – vocals, guitar, piano
 Joe Vitale – drums
 Neil Young – vocals, guitar, piano, harmonica

Setlist

This is the setlist from the Boston Garden date on the 26 June 1976

 "Love the One You're With" (Stills)
 "The Loner" (Young)
 "Long May You Run" (Young)
 "For What It's Worth" (Stills)
 "Helpless" (Young)
 "Black Queen" (Stills)
 "Southern Man" (Young)
 "On the Way Home" (Young)
 "Change Partners" (Stills)
 "Too Far Gone" (Young)
 "4+20" (Stills)
 "Word Game" (Stills)
 "Buyin' Time" (Stills)
 "Evening Coconut" (Young)
 "Make Love to You" (Stills)
 "Cowgirl in the Sand" (Young)
 "The Treasure" (Stills)
 "Suite: Judy Blue Eyes" (Stills)

References

External links

 Long May You Run at Myspace (streamed copy where licensed)
 Article about Neil Young's 1948 Buick Roadmaster Hearse, with Photos 

Stephen Stills albums
Neil Young albums
1976 debut albums
Albums produced by Tom Dowd
Albums produced by Don Gehman
Reprise Records albums
Albums produced by Neil Young
Albums produced by Stephen Stills
Collaborative albums
Art rock albums by American artists
Art rock albums by Canadian artists